The 2009 Men's South American Volleyball Championship was the 28th edition of the tournament, organised by CSV. It was held in Bogotá, Colombia from 15 to 21 August 2009.

Teams

Results

|}

|}

Final standing

Awards
MVP:  Murilo Endres
Best Spiker:  Gilberto Godoy Filho
Best Blocker:  Luis Díaz
Best Server:  Julián Chury
Best Digger:  Alexis González
Best Setter:  Luciano De Cecco
Best Receiver:  Enderwuin Herrera
Best Libero:  Sérgio Santos

External links
Results

Men's South American Volleyball Championships
S
Volleyball
V
August 2009 sports events in South America